João Victor Gomes Laranjeira Lima (born 15 March 2000), known as Laranjeira, is a Brazilian footballer who plays as a midfielder for Vasco da Gama.

Club career
Laranjeira signed a contract renewal with Vasco da Gama in February 2019, a three-year deal. He would have to wait two more years to make his professional debut, which came in a 1–0 loss to Portuguesa-RJ in the Campeonato Carioca.

His contract was again renewed in April 2022, this time for a year and a half. This extension was met with some backlash from Vasco de Gama fans, who felt Laranjeira had not done enough to deserve a new contract, and that the funds could go to renewing other players' contracts instead.

Career statistics

Club

References

2000 births
Living people
Sportspeople from Rio de Janeiro (state)
Brazilian footballers
Association football midfielders
Campeonato Brasileiro Série B players
CR Vasco da Gama players